The Severity of Alcohol Dependence Questionnaire (SADQ or SAD-Q) is a 20 item clinical screening tool designed to measure the presence and level of alcohol dependence. 

It is divided into five sections:
 Physical withdrawal symptoms
 Affective withdrawal symptoms
 Craving and relief drinking
 Typical daily consumption
 Reinstatement of dependence after a period of abstinence.

Each item is scored on a 4-point scale, giving a possible range of 0 to 60. A score of over 30 indicates severe alcohol dependence.

Some local clinical guidelines use the SADQ to predict the levels of medication needed during alcohol detoxification.

See also
Alcoholism
Substance abuse
 AUDIT Questionnaire
 CAGE Questionnaire
 CRAFFT Screening Test
 Paddington Alcohol Test
 List of diagnostic classification and rating scales used in psychiatry

References

External links
Online Severity of Alcohol Dependence Questionnaire

Alcohol abuse screening and assessment tools